Karl Kristian Vilhelm Steincke (25 August 1880 – 8 August 1963), was a Danish politician from the Social Democratic Party. He was justice minister from 1924 to 1926 in the Stauning I Cabinet, social minister from 1929 to 1935 in the Stauning II Cabinet, and justice minister again from 1935 to 1939 in the Stauning III Cabinet and in 1950 in the Hedtoft I and II Cabinets. He has been cited as the chief architect of the Danish welfare state with the Social Reform Acts of the early 1930s, including the Kanslergade Agreement.

Eugenics
Steincke is especially known for his book The Future's Social Welfare from 1920 in which he foretells:
"We treat the inferior individual with all care and love, but forbid him, in return, only to reproduce himself."

His book was the basis of the Danish laws about Eugenics, the sterilization and castration of unwanted elements. Steincke regarded the prevention of "inferior individuals" reproducing as important for society, as for the children of the "inferior individuals".

Notes

1880 births
1963 deaths
Danish Justice Ministers
Speakers of the Landsting (Denmark)
Burials at Vestre Cemetery, Copenhagen